Acorn is a raster graphic editor for macOS developed by August Mueller of Flying Meat Inc, based out of Mukilteo, Washington, United States.  Acorn was first released on September 10, 2007 and was built upon the framework of a previous image editing application of Flying Meat Inc., FlySketch.

Acorn makes extensive use of Apple's Core Image framework for its image processing,.  The native file format of Acorn is .acorn.  Acorn combines vector drawing with bitmap editing, and has been described as an alternative to Photoshop.  Key features of Acorn include image filters, a custom color picker, a brush designer, and image editing tools such as crop, erase, paint, select, pan, zoom, move, clone, smudge, dodge, and burn.

Major Features 
Layers-based editing
Layer masks and blending modes
Multi-layer screenshots 
Nondestructive stackable filters
Curves and levels
Multi-stop live gradients
Scriptable 
Automator support 
Built in brush designer to create custom brushes
Photoshop brush import
Vector shapes, Bézier pen tool, and text tools
Shape processor
Circle text tool
RAW image import
Multiple selection tools including quick mask and magic wand
Smart layer export
Web export
Guides, grids, rulers, and snapping
Native support for Apple’s retina displays
Color profile management
Deep color image support
Documentation online and in ePub format
Runs on Metal 2

Version history

Reviews and awards

Houston Chronicle Acorn 4 review
The 25 Best Alternatives to Photoshop
Macworld Editor's Choice Award 2009
Mac App Store Best Apps of 2013
Mac App Store Best Apps of 2015
50 Mac Essentials #46  
Acorn 5: Tom's Mac Software Pick 
Clash of the Image Editors: Acorn vs Pixelmator
Acorn 4 Macworld Review 
Acorn 4 The Verge Review  
16 Essential Photo Editor Apps

See also 
Comparison of raster graphics editors
Image Editing

References

External links 
 Official Webpage

Raster graphics editors
MacOS graphics software
MacOS-only software